A list of films produced in Pakistan in 1968 (see 1968 in film) and in the Urdu language:

1968

See also
 1968 in Pakistan

References

External links
 Search Pakistani film - IMDB.com

1968
Lists of 1968 films by country or language
Films